José Álvarez (15 October 1926 – 2 November 2021) was a sports shooter from the United States Virgin Islands. He competed in the 50 metre pistol event at the 1972 Summer Olympics.

References

External links
 

1926 births
2021 deaths
United States Virgin Islands male sport shooters
Olympic shooters of the United States Virgin Islands
Shooters at the 1972 Summer Olympics